Marking Time is an Australian television series.

Marking Time  may also refer to:

Military mark time, drill command and expression
"Marking Time", a song by The Olivia Tremor Control from Music from the Unrealized Film Script: Dusk at Cubist Castle